Khirki Mosque, approached from the Khirki Village in South Delhi and close to the Satpula or the seven arched bridge on the edge of southern wall of Jahanpanah (the fourth city of Medieval Delhi), was a mosque built by Khan-i-Jahan Junan Shah, the prime minister of  Feroz Shah Tughlaq (1351–1388) of the Tughlaq Dynasty. The word 'Khirki' prefixed to mosque is an Urdu word that means "window"  and hence is also called "The Mosque of Windows".

History
Khan-i-Jahan Junaan Telangani and Feroz Shah Tughlaq were intensely committed towards building architectural monuments. Together, they planned and built several tombs, forts and mosques. Telangani in particular, was credited with building seven monuments of unique designs. 
Constructed in the Jahapanah city, it is a novel cross–axial mosque in Tughluqian architectural style. There are no specific inscriptions on the Mosque on its construction date, though the name of the builder is inscribed on the eastern gate of the Mosque as 'Khan-e-Jahan Junaan Shah'. Therefore, in the absence of "epigraphic and literary" evidence (though one recent web reference mentions 1375 and another 1380) for its provenance, a research study has been provided by Welch and Howard in their paper titled "The Tughluqs: Master Builders of the Delhi Sultanate". The study has conjectured the year of building by comparing with many other large monuments of this period. It is dated between 1351 and 1354 when Feroz Shah Tughlaq, during his stay in Jahapanah, ordered this mosque to be built as "his pious inaugural contribution to the Capital". It is approached from the Khirki village in South Delhi and close to the Satpula or the seven arched bridge on the edge of southern wall of Jahapanah (the fourth city of Medieval Delhi), was mosque built by Khan-i-Jahan Junan Shah, the Prime Minister of Feroz Shah Tughlaq (1351–1388) of the Tughlaq Dynasty.[1] The word 'Khirki' prefixed to mosque is an Urdu word that means "window" and hence is also called "The Mosque of Windows".

Architecture

The open courtyards are the source of light and ventilation to the internal prayer spaces. The roof is partitioned into 25 squares of equal size with 9 small domes in each square (totaling to 81 domes) and alternated by 12 flat roofs to cover the roof. The four courtyards provide light and ventilation. The four corners of the mosque are adorned with towers with three protruding gateways, one in the middle of each face, with tapering turrets flanking each gate. The southern gate, with imposing steps at the main entrance, exhibits a combination of arch and trabeated construction. It has an ornamental rectilinear frame. The turrets flanking the southern and northern gates are circular in shape; the articulation on these gives them a three storied appearance. The main gate, which leads to the qibla on the western wall, has a projecting mihrab. Above the vaulted first floor cells, ubiquitous arch windows (carved out of stone guard) with perforated screens or jalis or tracery, known as "Khirkis", are seen on the second floor. However,the foyer in front of the mihrab is not well lighted since light from the latticed windows on the second floor do not penetrate this space. The approach to the roof of the mosque is from the east gate, and the view from the roof leaves a lasting impression of the geometrical design of the Mosque.
The mosque's walls are of rubble masonry construction with plastered surface on the outside. The interior walls are bland but provided with traditional carved stone screens. The symmetrically designed admirable mosque is considered one of “the finest architectural compositions of the Sultanate history.” It was considered Firuz Shah's architectural benefaction.
The importance of the Khirki Mosque's architectural elegance has been considered a precursor to the intensely metaphorical Mughal architecture (1526-1857), with the Lodhi period's (1451–1526) architecture – the Delhi Sultanate's last dynasty – marking the transition.

Restoration

Over the years, a few domes on the north–east side of the mosque have collapsed and a few walls are in a dilapidated condition. The roof is on the verge of collapse at many places. Delhi chapter of Indian National Trust for Art and Cultural Heritage (INTACH) has categorized the monument as "Grade A" in terms of archeological value. It is one of the 43 monuments identified by the Archaeological Survey of India (ASI) for restoration before the 2010 Commonwealth Games. Some conservation works have been initiated by ASI inside the mosque.

Heritage experts of Delhi were concerned by the status of the restoration works of the Khirki Mosque done by the ASI, which converted it into a pink monument (pictured) as distinct from the lime mortar work done in the ancient times. They pressed the ASI to re–examine the restoration procedures adopted by them for conservation works of Mughal monuments. ASI suspended the restoration works of the Mosque and held a workshop on "Use of lime mortar in ancient times" to educate their staff on proper restoration of Mughal monuments.

A conservationist commented that
Lime mortar survives for years but needs to be carefully prepared by using all the required ingredients in correct amount. However, to bypass the lengthy but necessary method, workers then changed the traditional mixing process – followed the world over and for centuries – to 50% lime mixed with 50% brick dust and not sand. This altered the chemical and physical properties and also made it more expensive exercise (brick dust costs more than sand).
The well established correct method of preparing a lime–surkhi mortar for conservation in the monuments, in the past, involved initially burning of lime in a kiln, then slaking it under water for a month and thereafter grinding it in a mortar mill in the proportion of 33% lime, 66% sand and other additives.

An ASI official conceded that Lime–surkhi was not used in proper proportion resulting in pink–coloured marks on some structures. ASI has now decided that in new restoration works, such as the Khirki Mosque, lime will be used in proper quantity.

Visitor information
Access to the mosque is through the narrow lanes of Khirki village near Saket, which is located in South Delhi. The mosque is on the other side of Press Enclave Marg from the Saket Citywalk Mall. The nearest metro station is Malviya Nagar. The mosque can be easily glimpsed down the narrow lanes off this main road. The remnants of the fourth city of Delhi, Jahanpanah, the raised Bijai Mandal Platform and the Begampur mosque with its variety of domes are other attractions close to the mosque. Nearer to the mosque, there is a bridge structure of the time called the Satpula (means seven bridges), part of the Jahanpanah boundary walls. It is a sluice weir with seven arched main spans, with two additional bays at a higher level on the flanks.

Recent Stories
https://www.jagranjosh.com/current-affairs/asi-discovers-254-copper-coins-of-medieval-era-at-khirki-mosque-1536813918-1

Gallery

References

Architecture of the Tughlaq dynasty
Mosques in Delhi
Monuments of National Importance in Delhi